John Hull (December 18, 1624October 1, 1683) was a silversmith, merchant, military officer, and politician in the Massachusetts Bay Colony. Starting as a silversmith in Boston, he became the moneyer responsible for issuing the colony’s coinage in the mid-1600s. He was a successful trader and engaged in several ventures in the slave trade. He was also an early benefactor of Harvard University and founder of Old South Church.

Early life and family 
John Hull was born on December 18, 1624 in Market Harborough, Leicestershire, England, the son of blacksmith Robert Hull and Elizabeth Hull. At age eleven, he immigrated to the Massachusetts Bay Colony with his father, mother, and half-brother, departing Bristol on September 28, 1635, and arriving in Boston on November 7. The colony gave Robert Hull a 25-acre farming plot, though he primarily made his living as a smith.

In England, Hull received an education at a grammar school. After immigrating, he attended Boston Latin School for two years, followed by a seven-year smithing apprenticeship. Hermann F. Clarke speculates that Hull would have finished his apprenticeship around 1643 or 1644. In December 1646, his father deeded to him a house and garden, where he began practicing the silversmith trade. 

On May 11, 1647, he married Judith Quincy (1626–1695), daughter of Judith Pares (d. 1654) and Edmund Quincy, in a ceremony officiated by John Winthrop. In 1648, they joined John Cotton's First Church in Boston. John and Judith had five children, four of whom died in infancy. They had twin girls on January 23, 1652, both of whom died at age one. On November 3, 1654, they had a son who died after 11 days, and in 1658 they had a second son, Samuel, who lived nineteen days. Their only child to survive to adulthood, Hannah, was born on February 14, 1657. She married Samuel Sewall on February 28, 1676, and died on October 19, 1717.

Boston mint

On May 26, 1652, during the English Commonwealth period, the Massachusetts General Court authorized the creation of Massachusetts coinage in shilling, sixpence and threepence denominations to address a coin shortage in the colony. To that point, the colony's economy had been entirely dependent on barter and foreign currency, including English, Spanish, Dutch, Portuguese and counterfeit coins. Hull was made Boston "mintmaster" and the colonial government paid for tools and construction of a minting facility on Hull's land. He employed Robert Sanderson as his assistant. Sanderson may have been primarily responsible for producing the coins.

From June to October, 1652, produced silver coins with a simple design: the stamped letters "NE" for New England on the obverse, and the denomination in Roman numerals on the reverse. In October 1652, the General Court ordered a more complicated design with a double ring of beads to discourage clipping. Although all the coins use the date 1652, they can be broken into three chronological periods based on the design of the tree on the obverse: the willow tree, 1652-1660; the oak tree, 1660-1667; and the pine tree, 1667-1682. The last design led to the series being known as pine tree shillings. In 1662, Hull and Sanderson also produced a series of oak tree twopence coins with the date 1662. In total, the Boston mint may have produced as many as 300,000 to 500,000 coins.

Hull made a profit of one shilling for every 20 produced, and in some years, Hull made of profit over £1000. The Massachusetts General Court tried to renegotiate the arrangement to decrease Hull's profits on at least seven occasions. Massachusetts also charged rent on the minting facility until Hull purchased the operation in 1675.

In 1661 after the restoration of the monarchy, the English government considered the Boston mint to be treasonous. In 1665, Privy Council ordered the mint to cease operations, but the colony ignored the demands. In 1676, Edward Randolph petitioned the English government to close the mint. However, the mint may have continued operations until 1682, when Hull's contract as mintmaster expired, and the colony did not move to renew his contract or appoint a new mintmaster. The coinage was a contributing factor to the revocation of the Massachusetts Bay Colony charter in 1684.

Merchant and landowner
Hull first mentioned exporting goods to England in a November 1653 diary entry. Between 1653 and 1660, he exported goods to Europe on at least five different ships, and his mercantile interests increased after 1660. The first record of Hull holding a partial ownership stake in a ship is from 1664 Between 1665 and 1670, Hull had partial ownership of eight vessels, and from 1670 to 1683, he partially owned 14 vessels and exported goods on more than 50 different ships. He had business agents in England, Jamaica, New Providence, Nevis, Madeira and the Canary Islands.

He primarily exported furs, fish and wood from New England forests. He also shipped New England farm products, including flour, salt beef and pork, biscuits and butter to the Caribbean colonies, as well as other miscellaneous goods. He imported salt, clothing and alcohol to Massachusetts. He also dealt in mortgages and was a money lender.

Hull required his ship captains to abstain from selling damaged goods, mistreating sailors, swearing, and trading on Sundays. Mark Valeri claims that Hull forbid his associates from the slave trade, but Clarke has identified two occasions when Hull engaged in the slave trade: the first during King Philip's War in 1675, when Hull transported more than one hundred Native American captives to be sold into slavery in Cadiz and Malaga, and the second on September 16, 1682, when he instructed one of his captains to transport and sell a Black man named Jeofrey and Black woman named Mary in Madeira.

Valeri characterizes Hull as having belonged to the upper ranks of Boston's merchants, though some traders built larger fortunes and others held larger tracts of land.

Civic life

From 1648, Hull was a member of the Ancient and Honorable Artillery Company of Massachusetts. He appears in records as an ensign in 1663, a lieutenant in 1664, and a captain in 1671 and 1678. He sat in the Massachusetts General Court as representative for Wenham in 1668, Westfield from 1671 to 1674, and Salisbury in 1679. He was treasurer of the Massachusetts Bay Colony from 1676 to 1680. 

In 1669, Hull left the First Church and became a founding member of the Third Church in Boston.

During King Philip's War in 1675 and 1676, Hull loaned the colony approximately £2000 to buy muskets, shot, and saltpeter, and to clothe and pay the soldiers. Among his responsibilities as treasurer during King Philip's War, Hull arranged the sale of Native American captives into slavery. Hull recorded the sale of 185 people into slavery in public auctions on August 24, 1676, and September 23, 1676. Some buyers, such as Thomas Smith, purchased as many as 70 captives to resell in European slave markets. Mark Peterson speculates that the colony may have used some of the £333, 3s proceeds from the sales to partially repay its debt to Hull. Hull's widow and son-in-law, Samuel Sewall, settled the remainder debt with the colony in 1683 after Hull's death.

He originally owned Longwood Historic District (Massachusetts),  Muddy River (Massachusetts), a 350 acre farm passed down to his daughter Hannah Hull (Sewell) Brookline MA. Hull, having known John Harvard (clergyman) was one of Harvard College's earliest benefactors giving £100 and a library to the college.

Death and legacy
Hull died on October 1, 1683. Samuel Willard preached his funeral sermon, and he was buried in the Granary Burying Ground. At the time of his death, his estate was worth approximately £6000.

Hull Street in Boston is named for him, because the road was laid through his pasture. In the 1840 story collection Grandfather's Chair, Nathaniel Hawthorne recounts a legend in which John Hull gave his daughter Hannah her weight in pine-tree shillings (approximately 10,000 coins) as a dowery at her wedding to Samuel Sewall.

References

Citations

Sources

Further reading

 

1624 births
1683 deaths
American silversmiths
American slave traders
Coin designers
Colonial American merchants
Currency designers
Directors of coin mints
People from colonial Boston
People from Market Harborough